Coleophora spiraeella is a moth of the family Coleophoridae. It is found in Central and Southern Europe, from Germany and Poland to Italy and Slovenia.

The larvae feed on Filipendula ulmaria, Spiraea hypericifolia obovata, Spiraea japonica, Spiraea media, Spiraea salicifolia and Ulmaria palustris. Larvae can be found from June to September.

References

External links
Swedish Moths

spiraeella
Moths of Europe
Moths described in 1916